Phaedranassa tunguraguae is a species of plant that is endemic to Ecuador.  Its natural habitats are subtropical or tropical moist montane forests and subtropical or tropical dry shrubland. It is threatened by habitat loss.

References

Flora of Ecuador
tunguraguae
Endangered plants
Taxonomy articles created by Polbot